The Fula (or Fulani) jihads sometimes called the Fulani revolution were a series of jihads that occurred across West Africa during the 18th and 19th centuries, led largely by the Muslim Fula people. The jihads and the jihad states came to an end with European colonization.

The first uprising inspired by Islam and which was against Hausa rulers took place in 1725, when Fula pastoralists, assisted by Muslim traders, rose against the indigenous chiefdoms of Hausa Maguzawa rulers. By 1750, the Fula had established the Imamate of Sokoto and placed the region under sharia law. Their success inspired the Fula and Toucouleurs on the banks of the lower Senegal to establish their own Imamate, Futa Toro, through a series of wars between 1769 and 1776.

In the early 19th century, the jihad movement spread eastward to the Hausa states. The result of a series of jihads begun in 1804 by the revolutionary Usman dan Fodio was the Sokoto Caliphate, the largest state in West Africa up to that time. An aggressively expansionist polity, it severely weakened the old Bornu Kingdom.

Foremost among the motivators for the jihads was unity through the spread of religion, and the procurement of slaves by conquering neighbouring peoples.

Jihad as Islamic reform
The reforms aimed to create Islamic states across Western Africa. The reforms also aimed to counter socio-political problems, including under population and shortages of goods such as food and water, which together intensified existing economic problems. Furthermore, they also wanted to stop the European invasion of Africa and the Islamic world, as at this time many European nations were colonizing parts of Africa and Islamic empires such as the Ottomans were weakening.
These aims were met with mixed results across the several jihad movements and resulting caliphates that emerged during the 19th century, as some were able to achieve these goals better than others.

Reform in practice

On developing a stable economy to finance development and bring prosperity to the population, some caliphates were largely successful. The Sokoto Caliphate under the control of Muhammad Bello and Wazir Gidado established a strong economy based on agriculture and artisan goods.
This economic growth allowed them to fund political, educational and military development within the Caliphate which lead to it invading and conquering surrounding areas, increasing the number of people under its administration and so achieving the secondary aim of spreading the word of Islam. However, other groups, even within the Sokoto Caliphate, were not able to establish such a stable economy, such as under the Masina jihad of Shaikh Ahmad. During his conflict he struggled to establish a strong economy due to his lack of resources to safely guard the roaming cattle herds and as such, large parts of the military activity. Hindered by a lack of military and economic resources, due to a more defensive strategy, the Masina jihad was less successful in conquering other areas and spreading its domain of control on the same scale as the Sokoto Caliphate. It can therefore be seen that the development of a stable economy and a strong armed force were largely linked, with different jihad movements having varying strengths in these departments, resulting in different levels of success.

In their defence against European invaders few groups were successful and, instead of defeating the invaders, many Muslim populations had to carry out mass migrations across northern Africa to escape. Those fighting under the jihad of Al-Hajj Vmar were forced to flee, as they were unable to push the French forces out of the Senegal River region.  This action heavily damaged the legitimacy of this jihad's leadership as it showed the people that their leaders could not protect them effectively. One benefit of this occurring however, was that it created a greater sense of Muslim identity and caused many Caliphates to increase their interactions with other Caliphates, unifying them against a common enemy and reducing the internal fighting amongst the different groups. So, although many of the Caliphates were unable to achieve their goal of being able to operate an effective military defence against European invaders, they were able to achieve the goal of increasing intra-Muslim relations and cooperation, by doing so increasing the sense of Islamic unity and identity.

When it came to the task of establishing strong and legitimate rule over the Caliphates, the Islamic protagonists were not always successful.  In the Hamdullahi Caliphate there was a strong sense of legitimacy under the 30 years rule of Seku Amadu but he failed to name a successor.  This led to confusion and ultimately it was decided by council that his son should rule. Unfortunately for his son, this decree did not carry the same sense of legitimacy as if Amadu had himself selected his child. The son's plans actually differed from his father, especially on teaching, and as such he failed to gain the support of the older cohorts of the population. This inability to maintain a consistent plan for the area damaged the legitimacy of the ruling classes. That having been said, many groups followed a hereditary ideal behind leadership and so the handing down of power by father to son was frequent across the Islamic groups and still retained legitimacy for ruling groups. This can be seen in the Sokoto caliphate were the main leaders, the Sultans, all belonged to the same family who descended from Usman Dan Fodio.

Jihad and society

Overall, the teaching and spreading of Islam across the area was a largely successful endeavour. Under the Sokoto Caliphate, large amounts of Islamic literature were printed and widely distributed.
This literature not only made available to elite men but also was spread to other groups within society such as women, slaves and illiterate males.
This wider distribution of Islamic texts across the caliphate led to a wider teaching of the desired Islamic practises and ideas that the leaders of the Caliphate deemed as being correct. The distribution from the Sokoto caliphate also became the inspiration for other jihad movements across the Hausaland region and heavily influenced how administrative structures were to be organised, if the jihad proved to be successful.
The spread of Islamic law slowly took over from prior traditions, meaning more Islamist populations were formed, which forged older traditions in favour for Islam.
The spread of Islam and its teachings was a large success, especially in Sokoto and Masina, and new Muslim societies were formed where Islamic ideals impacted law, politics and daily life.

The jihad movements of the 19th century were largely successful in their aims of founding their new societies. Strong economies were formed both in Sokoto and Masina, as were reasonably strong armed forces. The leaders and teachings off the Caliphates were largely supported and enjoyed legitimacy in their rule. The spread of Islamic teachings spread across law, politics and daily life and resulted in the Muslim population growing. The obvious failure was that although they delayed it, they were unable to stop the European colonization of Africa and by the early 20th century, most of the Islamic societies had been colonized by the British, French, or Germans.

Jihad states

Bundu

A small state in present-day Senegal in which Muslim Fulas took control in the late 17th century.

Futa Jallon

The Futa Jallon, located mainly in present-day Guinea, Guinea Bissau, Senegal, and Sierra Leone, was a major state with a written constitution and ruling alternance between the 2 main parties: the Soriya and the Alphaya. The Futa Jallon state was born in 1735 when Fulani Muslims decided to rise against the non-Muslim indigenous groups and Djalonke rulers to create a confederation of provinces. Alpha Ibrahima Sambegu was elected as the first Almaamy in 1725 at the capital Timbo in present-day Guinea. The Futa Jallon state lasted until 1898 when the French colonial troops defeated the last Almamy (Ruler) Bokar Biro Barry, dismantled the state and integrated it into their new colony of Rivières du Sud, which became Guinea.

Futa Toro

Under the unifying banner of Islam, the Muslim Fulas revolted against the non-Muslim Fulani of the Denianke Kingdom in 1776 under the leadership of Sileymaani Baal. The following Islamic revolution created the new kingdom of Futa Toro under a government called the Almamate (a term derived from the Pulaar borrowing of the Arabic al-imaam). Before formal colonization this state was weakened by French incursions and the effort by El Hadj Umar Tall to carry his "jihad" eastward (see also Toucouleur Empire, below).

Sokoto Caliphate

At the beginning of the 19th century under Usman dan Fodio the Fulani became the leaders of a centralized Fulani Empire which continued until 1903 when the Fulani were divided up among European colonizers.

Fulani states in Bornu

The term jihad state is historically used in reference to the 19th century Bornu in Western Africa, especially the Fulani jihad or Fulbe (from Fulɓe) jihad, a phrase referring to the state-founding jihad led by Usman dan Fodio in the first decade of the 19th century in and around Nigeria. Most of these states were in colonial times brought into the British Northern Nigeria Protectorate around 1901–1903.

The jihad states in the region controlled by the empire included:
Abuja, replacing the former Zuba; the ruler's title was Sarkin Zazzau, from 1828 also Emir
Adamawa (now partially in Cameroon), founded in 1809; title Baban-Lamido
Agaie, founded in 1822; title emir
Bauchi Emirate, founded in 1805; title Lamido (laamiiɗo in Fula language), meaning "ruler" (similar meaning to Emir )
Gombe, founded in 1804; title Modibo Gombe.
Gwandu, a major Fulbe jihad state, founded in 1817; title Emir
Hadejia, replaced Biram (title Sarkin Biram) in 1805; new title Sarkin Hadejia, from 1808 also styled Emir
Jama`are, founded in 1811; style Emir.
Jema`an Darroro, founded in 1810; title Emir
Kano replaced the old (Hausa) Kano state in March 1807; the old title Sarkin Kano is still used, but now also styled Emir
Katagum, founded in 1807; title Sarkin Katagum, also styled Emir
Katsina replaced the old (Hausa) Katsina state in 1805; the old title Sarkin Katsina is still used, but now also styled Emir.
Kazaure, founded in 1818; title Emir, also styled Sarkin *Arewa (apparently imitating neighbours)
Keffi, founded in 1802; title Emir
Lafiagi, founded in 1824; new title Emir
Lapai, founded in 1825; style Emir
Massina Empire
Mubi, founded in 18..; title Emir
Muri, founded in 1817, style Emir; 1892-1893 de facto French protectorate, 1901 part of Northern Nigerian British protectorate
Sokoto, the center of the Fulani jihad, established on 21 February 1804 by Usman dan Fodio, title Amir al-Mu´minin, also styled Lamido Julbe; on 20 April 1817 Sokoto was styled sultanate (title sultan, also styled Amir al-Mu´minin and Sarkin Musulmi), the suzerain of all Fulbe jihad states; in 1903 the British occupied Sokoto Sultanate
Zaria, superseded the old Zazzau state (title Sarkin Zazzau) on 31 December 1808; new style first Malam, since October/November 1835 Emir, also styled Sarkin Zaria and Sarkin Zazzau

Massina Empire

Located in what is now central Mali, this state lasted from 1818 until 1862. Inspired by the recent Muslim uprisings of Usman dan Fodio in nearby Hausaland, preacher and social reformer Seku Amadu led a Fula army in jihad against the Bambara Empire. The empire expanded rapidly, taking Djenné and establishing a new capital at Hamdullahi. It was eventually defeated by Umar Tall and incorporated into the Toucouleur Empire.

Toucouleur Empire

El Hajj Umar Tall led armies east from his base in Futa Tooro and Dinguiraye to conquer Kaarta, the Bambara Empire, and Massina in the early 1860s. The Toucouleur controlled the region until French colonization, at which time the last leader of the state, Ahmadu Tall, fled to Sokoto.

References

Bibliography

Offensive jihad
West Africa
Countries in precolonial Africa
Fula history